TSR2 ribosome maturation factor is a protein that in humans is encoded by the TSR2 gene.

Function

The protein encoded by this gene appears to repress the transcription of NF-kappaB and may be involved in apoptosis. Defects in this gene are a cause of Diamond-Blackfan anemia. [provided by RefSeq, Oct 2016].

References

Further reading